The 1976 Democratic National Convention met at Madison Square Garden in New York City, from July 12 to July 15, 1976.  The assembled United States Democratic Party delegates at the convention nominated former Governor Jimmy Carter of Georgia for president and Senator Walter Mondale of Minnesota for vice president. John Glenn and Barbara Jordan gave the keynote addresses. Jordan's keynote address made her the first African-American woman to deliver the keynote address at a Democratic National Convention. The convention was the first in New York City since the 103-ballot 1924 convention.

By the time the convention opened Carter already had more than enough delegates to clinch the nomination, and so the major emphasis at the convention was to create an appearance of party unity, which had been lacking in the 1968 and 1972 Democratic Conventions. Carter easily won the nomination on the first ballot. He then chose Mondale, a liberal and a protégé of Hubert Humphrey, as his running mate.

The Carter–Mondale ticket went on to win the 1976 presidential election on November 2.

The convention is also notable for the fact that congresswoman Lindy Boggs, who presided over it, thus became the first woman to preside over a national political convention.

Platform
The Democrats' 1976 platform called for continued price controls on natural gas, a policy which had caused dwindling domestic natural gas reserves since 1974 and which President Gerald Ford was asking to rescind. The platform stated: "Those now pressing to turn natural-gas price regulation over to OPEC, while arguing the rhetoric of so-called deregulation, must not prevail."

Abortion 
The platform added "it is undesirable to attempt to amend the U.S. Constitution to overturn [Roe v. Wade]".

Presidential vote tally 
The following people had their names placed in nomination.

The tally at the convention was:

Vice Presidential nomination
According to Jimmy Carter, his top choices for vice president were: Walter Mondale, Edmund Muskie, Frank Church, Adlai Stevenson III, John Glenn, and Henry M. Jackson. He selected Mondale.

The vice presidential tally was:

 Walter Mondale, 2,817 (94.28%)
 Carl Albert, 36 (1.21%)
 Barbara Jordan, 25 (0.84%)
 Ron Dellums, 20 (0.67%)
 Henry M. Jackson, 16 (0.54%)
 Gary Benoit, 12 (0.40%)
 Frank Church, 11 (0.37%)
 Fritz Efaw, 11 (0.37%)
 Peter F. Flaherty, 11 (0.37%)
 George Wallace, 6 (0.20%)
 Allard K. Lowenstein, 5 (0.17%)
 Edmund Muskie, 4 (0.13%)
 Philip Hart, 2 (0.07%)
 Thomas E. Morgan, 2 (0.07%)
 Mo Udall, 2 (0.07%)
 Al Castro, 1 (0.03%)
 Fred R. Harris, 1 (0.03%)
 Ernest Hollings, 1 (0.03%)
 Peter W. Rodino, 1 (0.03%)
 Josephine E. R. A. Smith, 1 (0.03%)
 Daniel Schorr, 1 (0.03%)
 Hunter S. Thompson, 1 (0.03%)
 Wendell Anderson, 1 (0.03%)

In his acceptance speech, Mondale diverted from his printed text which echoed John F. Kennedy's call to "get the country moving again;" Mondale instead said, "Let's get this government moving again!"

See also
 1976 Republican National Convention
 1976 United States presidential election
 History of the United States Democratic Party
 List of Democratic National Conventions
 United States presidential nominating convention
 1976 Democratic Party presidential primaries

References

External links
 Democratic Party Platform of 1976 at The American Presidency Project
 Carter Nomination Acceptance Speech for President at DNC (transcript) at The American Presidency Project
 Text and audio of Barbara Jordan's keynote address
 List of members from various state delegations to convention
 Video of Carter nomination acceptance speech for President at DNC (via YouTube)
 Audio of Carter nomination acceptance speech for President at DNC
 Video of Mondale nomination acceptance speech for Vice President at DNC (via YouTube)

1976 United States presidential election
1976 in New York City
Political conventions in New York City
New York State Democratic Committee
Political events in New York (state)
Democratic National Conventions
1976 conferences
July 1976 events in the United States
Jimmy Carter
Walter Mondale
1970s in Manhattan